Maaret Elnaasan  is a Syrian village located in Taftanaz Nahiyah in Idlib District, Idlib.  According to the Syria Central Bureau of Statistics (CBS), Maaret Elnaasan had a population of 8375 in the 2004 census.

Syrian Civil War 
On 12 February 2022, 6 civilians were killed after Syrian army artillery bombarded the village, that as of 2022, is under the control of the Syrian Salvation Government.

References 

Populated places in Idlib District